Herne Hill is a residential suburb of Geelong, Victoria, Australia. At the 2016 census, Herne Hill had a population of 3,413. It is in the federal Division of Corio, and its postcode is 3218.

The former Geelong Protestant and Orphan Asylum and common school was built in 1855 -  one of the first four orphanages set up in Victoria during the 1850s.

The orphan asylum site was acquired by Portland Cement in 1933.

Herne Hill's suburban growth came after World War II.

The State primary and Catholic primary schools opened in 1954 and 1955, and a State technical school opened in 1954. The Catholic Brigidine Sisters opened a convent and Clonard College in 1956.

Heritage listed sites 

 "Karoomba" - 48 Heytesbury Street

References

Suburbs of Geelong